The 1967 Munster Senior Club Hurling Championship was the fourth staging of the Munster Senior Club Hurling Championship since its establishment by the Munster Council. The championship, which was open to the champion clubs of 1967, began on 24 March 1968 and ended on 6 October 1968.

On 6 October 1968, Newmarket-on-Fergus won the championship after a 3-09 to 2-07 defeat of Carrick Davins in the final at Seán Treacy Park. It was their first ever championship title.

Results

First round

Semi-finals

Finals

References

1967 in hurling
Munster Senior Club Hurling Championship